Kalateh-ye Jomeh (also Romanized as Kalāteh-ye Jom‘eh) is a village in Sahra Rural District, Anabad District, Bardaskan County, Razavi Khorasan Province, Iran. At the 2006 census, its population was 90, in 24 families.

References 

Populated places in Bardaskan County